The Windsor Wolves are a rugby league team based in the town of Windsor, New South Wales.  The club fields both junior and senior teams in the Penrith District Rugby League competitions. The club has fielded teams in semi-professional, New South Wales Rugby League competitions. In March 2020 the club re-entered the third-tier Ron Massey Cup and fourth-tier Sydney Shield competitions. These competitions were cancelled after one round of matches due to the COVID-19 pandemic in Australia. When the Sydney Shield was reorganised for a restart in July 2020, Windsor did not participate.

Playing Record in NSWRL Competitions

Second Tier 
The Wolves received an enormous boost in July 2007 as they signed a deal with the Penrith Panthers to act as a feeder club for them in the NSW Cup for three seasons. This was a great achievement for the small club and meant that they participated in one of two competitions that sit immediately below the National Rugby League. The deal was extended, but ended at the conclusion of the 2013 season.

Third Tier
The Windsor Wolves had played in the NSWRL Jim Beam Cup since the inception of the competition in 2003 to 2016. This competition is now known as the Ron Massey Cup. In the mid-1970s, Windsor competed in an equivalent, the Metropolitan Cup. They also participated for a single season in 1993.

The Wolves won the Jim Beam Cup competition twice, in 2005 and 2008, defeating Sydney Bulls on both occasions 23 - 18 in 2005 & 36 - 16 in 2008 grand finals.

Fourth Tier
The Windsor Wolves competed in the 2015 and 2016 Sydney Shield seasons. They entered a team in the 2020 competition, playing one match before the competition was cancelled. Windsor did not enter a team when the competition was reorganised and run through July to September. In the mid-1970s, Windsor fielded a team in the Metropolitan Cup Reserve Grade competition, winning that premiership on two occasions.

Team Of The Century
1.Chris Walker

2.Collin Murphy

3.Vaughan Humphreys

4.Terry Glover

5.Dan Randall

6.Ron Phillips

7.Garry Longhurst

8.Tito Nuimata

9.Keith Sunderland

10.Leo Grosso

11.Tony Buckpitt

12.Jim Moffat

13.Richie Grech

14.Ray Robinson

15.Val De Bono

16.Craig Trindall

17.Tony Saunders

Coach. Rod Payne

Notable Juniors 
Mitchell Kenny
Matt Moylan
Lachlan Coote
Reagan Campbell-Gillard
George Jennings
Brandon Smallwood 
Matthew Wickett
Debbie Wickett
Brendan Martin-Wein
James Moss
Ryan Arnold (convicted sex offender)

Gallery

See also

List of rugby league clubs in Australia
Rugby league in New South Wales

References

External links

Rugby league teams in Sydney
Rugby clubs established in 1912
1912 establishments in Australia
Ron Massey Cup
Windsor, New South Wales